Marjorie Grice-Hutchinson MBE (26 May 1909 – 12 April 2003) was an English economist.

Early life and education 
Marjorie Eileen Henrietta Grice-Hutchinson was born in 1909, in Eastbourne, Sussex, the daughter of George Grice-Hutchinson and Edith Louise Eastwick Grice-Hutchinson. Her father was a solicitor. When her father retired to Málaga in 1920, Grice-Hutchinson went with him. 

She earned a degree in Spanish at the University of London, and completed a Ph.D. at the London School of Economics, under the supervision of Friedrich Hayek and R. S. Sayers.

Career 
Grice-Hutchinson is best known for her work on the history of economic thought in Spain, and particularly that of the late Scholastic School of Salamanca. She also wrote a history of the English Cemetery in Málaga, and endowed an agricultural research program at the University of Málaga.

In 1993, she was awarded an honorary doctorate at the Complutense University of Madrid. She became a Distinguished Fellow of the History of Economics Society in 1995. She was appointed a Member of the Order of the British Empire in 1975, and in Spain she was named to the Order of Civil Merit.

Personal life 

Grice-Hutchinson became the Baroness von Schlippenbach in 1951, when she married Ulrich von Schlippenbach, a German-born agronomist who resided in Málaga,  She was widowed when von Schlippenbach died in the 1980s. She lived in Málaga until her death in 2003, aged 93 years. She was buried there, in the English Cemetery. Her book The School of Salamanca was reprinted in 2009 by the Ludwig von Mises Institute.

Selected works

The School of Salamanca; Readings in Spanish Monetary Theory, 1544-1605 (1952)
Malaga Farm (1956)
Children of the Vega: Growing up on a Farm in Spain (1963)
Early Economic Thought in Spain, 1177-1740 (1978)
Economic Thought in Spain: Selected Essays (1993)
The English Cemetery at Málaga (2001)

References

1909 births
2003 deaths
English economists
British Hispanists
Historians of economic thought
British women economists
English women non-fiction writers
British women anthropologists

Alumni of the London School of Economics